Stéphanie Dubois and Marie-Ève Pelletier were the defending champions, but none entered this year as both were competing in Montreal at the same week.

Carly Gullickson and Nicole Kriz won the title by defeating Christina Fusano and Junri Namigata 6–7(4–7), 6–1, [10–5] in the final.

Seeds

Draw

Draw

References
 Main Draw (ITF)
 Qualifying Draw (ITF)

Odlum Brown Vancouver Open – Women's Doubles
Vancouver Open